PlusTV was a Finnish digital terrestrial television distributor owned by Finnish telecommunications company DNA. It is one of two pay television distributors in the Finnish terrestrial network, the other being Canal Digital.

The package started in November 2006, initially only containing the MTV3 Max and MTV3 Juniori channels. In April 2007, the movie channel MTV3 Leffa launched in the Subtv Juniori downtime.
With the closedown of the analogue signal on September 1, 2007, a new multiplex was launched, allowing the addition of seven new channels: Discovery Channel, Eurosport, MTV3 Fakta, MTV Finland and Nickelodeon. It also meant that the formerly free-to-air pornographic Digiviihde channel joined the PlusTV package.

In September, 2013 DNA Oy bought PlusTV.

References

External links
PlusTV - Official site

Television in Finland